Nastoceras is a genus of moths in the family Autostichidae described by Pierre Chrétien in 1922.

Species
 Nastoceras colluellum Chrétien, 1922
 Nastoceras candidella (Chrétien, 1922)

References

Symmocinae